Grupo Bimbo, S.A.B. de C.V. (also known simply as Bimbo) is a Mexican multinational food company with a presence in over 33 countries located in the Americas, Europe, Asia, and Africa. It has an annual sales volume of 15 billion dollars and is listed on the Mexican stock exchange with the ticker BIMBO.

Grupo Bimbo has 134,000 employees, 196 bakery plants, 3 million points of sale, a distribution network with 57 thousand routes all over the world. The company has more than 100 brands and 13 thousand products, like Bimbo, Tía Rosa, Entenmann's, Pullman, Rainbo, Nutrella, Marinela, Oroweat, Sara Lee, Thomas', Arnold and Barcel. Its strategic associations include Alicorp (Peru); Blue Label (Mexico); Fincomún, Galletas la Moderna, Grupo Nutresa (Colombia); Mundo Dulce (Argentina); among others.

As of 1997, Daniel Servitje is Grupo Bimbo's CEO, and its chairman since 2013.

History

1945 – 1960 
Grupo Bimbo began operations in Mexico City  on December 2, 1945, with Panificación Bimbo, S.A. as the official name. The company started with 34 employees, selling cellophane-wrapped large and small white loaf bread, rye bread, and toast bread. Lorenzo Servitje Sendra, José T. Mata, Jaime Sendra Grimau, Jaime Jorba Sendra, and Alfonso Velasco, were the partners who started the bakery company.

The name "Bimbo" was chosen among other candidates such as PanRex, Pan NSE (initials in Spanish for Nutritious, Tasty, and Inexpensive), Sabrosoy, Pan Lirio, and Pan Azteca. The name was formed as the combination of the Bambi and Dumbo films, the favourite films of Marinela, Lorenzo Servitje's daughter. Later, the founders would find out that bimbo is an Italian slang for children (shortened from bambino), and that in China the phoneme for bread (面包/Miànbāo) is similar to the name of the brand.

The brand's ambassador, the Bimbo Bear, was also created in 1945. It all began with a bear drawing in a Christmas Card given to Jaime Jorba. Anita Mata, Jaime Sendra's wife, was the one who added distinct features such as the hat, the apron, and the bread under its arm. Finally, Alfonso Velasco rearranged the shape of the nose to reflect the cleanness, whiteness, and softness.

By 1948, Grupo Bimbo had nine different products like white bread, toast bread, black bread, sweet bread, buns, and muffins. Thanks to the production growth, in 1949, the first branch outside of Mexico City was opened in Puebla, Mexico.

By the 1950s, Grupo Bimbo took its products to more people with the "38", a delivery truck with speakers that helped promote the products. Shortly afterward, the portfolio extended with the addition of Bimbo Bear Donuts, Bimbollos, Medias Noches (hot dog bread), and Colchones.

On its tenth anniversary, in 1955, Grupo Bimbo had 700 employees and 140 vehicles. In 1956, the company opened Bimbo de Occidente (Bimbo of the West) factory with Roberto Servitje as its general manager, and, in 1958, launched Gansito, a chocolate-covered snack cake filled with strawberry jam and cream.

1961 – 1980 
In the 1960s, Grupo Bimbo kept expanding with its arrival in Monterrey, Mexico, and its first administrative restructuring in 1963, which lead to the creation of its corporate structure. A year later, in 1964, the company acquired the rights in Mexico of Quality Bakers of America's brand, Sunbeam.

In the 1970s, the company had significant growth in several areas. In 1971, Barcel, one of its most important brands, began operations; In 1972, it opened its bakery plant located in Azcapotzalco, Mexico City, the largest in Latin America and one of the ten largest in the world, at the time.

During this decade, Grupo Bimbo entered the marmalade market with Carmel (1973); inaugurated Suandy and Tía Rosa (1974), began the production of Conchas Bimbo (1975); and launched Ricolino, the company's leading sweets and chocolate brand, and Bubulubu with it (1978). By the end of the 1970s, Grupo Bimbo was formed by 3 companies, 12 plants, and 15,000 employees; during this time, Roberto Servitje was appointed CEO.

1981 – 2000 
At the beginning of the 1980s, Grupo Bimbo presented relevant internal and external changes. It started quoting on the Mexican Stock Exchange, trading 15% of its shares, and in 1986 a new organizational structure was generated, from which a single industrial group was created. In these years, exports to the United States of America began (1984); Bimbo Centroamerica was created (1989) with the construction of a plant in Guatemala, which was completed in 1990.

In the early 1990s, Milpa Real tortillas and Lonchibon were added to its brands. In 1993, opened its new corporate building in Santa Fe, Mexico City, and in 1995, acquired Coronado, an enterprise specialized in cajeta-based products. During this decade a further expansion in Latin America took place, with the arrival of Bimbo in Argentina and the opening of the regional corporate (1991), as well as the Ideal plant in Chile (1995). In 1994, Groupo Bimbo purchased La Hacienda, a tortilla maker in California expanding its operations in the U.S. market. In 1997, it furthered its US based offerings to the U.S. bread market with the purchase of Pacific Prides Bakery, San Diego, CA and in 1998 when it purchased Mrs Baird's Bakeries in Texas, Bimbo Bakeries USA (BBU) was born.

Finally, in 1997, Daniel Servitje was appointed the company's CEO, setting a new course for Grupo Bimbo's operations worldwide.

2001 – 2010 
At the beginning of the 21st century, Grupo Bimbo added brands such as Plus Vita and Pullman in Brazil (2001); Joyco, the manufacturer of Duvalín, Bocadín and Lunetas (2004); El Globo and La Corona (2005); and Nutrella of Brazil (2008) to its portfolio.

In 2006, the company began operations in the Asian market with the acquisition of the Panrico Bakery in Beijing, China, and strengthen its presence in the United States of America with of George Weston Limited bakery, owner of brands such as Thomas, Oroweat, Arnold, Boboli, Stroehmann and Freihofer's in 2009.

2011 – present 
In this decade, Grupo Bimbo consolidated itself as the largest bakery company in the world by acquiring Sara Lee North American Fresh Bakery in the United States; Fargo in Argentina; and Bimbo Iberia in Spain and Portugal, in 2011. A year later, the company completed its most important conversion to renewable energy with the inauguration of the Piedra Larga wind farm (in Oaxaca, Mexico), which supplies several of Grupo Bimbo's facilities, as well as its electric vehicles fleet with "green" energy.

In the following years, Grupo Bimbo acquired several companies to boost its global growth strategy, some of the most prominent were: in 2014, Canada Bread (Canada) and Supan (Ecuador); in 2015, Vachon (Canada); and, in 2016, Panettiere (Colombia), General Mills (Argentina) and Panrico S.A.U. (Spain and Portugal).

In 2017, began operations in África and continued its growth in Africa, with the acquisition of Grupo Adghal in Morocco; East Balt, one of the most important foodservice companies in China, France, Italy, Morocco, Russia, South Africa, South Korea, Switzerland, Turkey, Ukraine, and the United States; and by purchasing 65% of the Ready India Private Limited's (Ready Roti) shares. This year, Grupo Bimbo added to its portfolio brands like Bays English Muffins (United States) and Stonemill Bakehouse (Canada).

In 2018, the company continued its expansion and completed the purchase of Nutra Bien brands in Chile and El Paisa in Colombia, in order to grow in South America; Grupo Mankattan, a leader in the baking industry in China, thriving its growth in the fast-food channel in that country. That same year, Grupo Bimbo joined the RE100 initiative, committing to being 100% renewable, energy-wise, by 2025. It also became the first Mexican company to issue Clean Energy Certificates for Distributed Generation.

In 2019, it kept promoting some of its corporate social responsibility initiatives like the Good Neighbor program, Reforestamos México (Reforestation), and Limpiemos México (Clean-up). Among these campaigns, Without Leaving Trace stood out, with which Grupo Bimbo committed that 100% of its packaging will be recyclable, biodegradable, and/or compostable by 2025.

In February 2020, Grupo Bimbo expanded its operations and arrived in Kazakhstan, through Bimbo QSR (Quick Service Restaurants), a strategic association agreement was signed with Food Town, the exclusive supplier of buns and McDonald's franchisee in that country. With this agreement, the company expanded its presence to 33 countries.

In May 2022, Grupo Bimbo agreed to sell its confectionery business, Ricolino, to the Chicago-headquartered food processing company, Mondelēz International for approximately US$1.3 billion. The sale was completed on November of that same year.

Corporate structure 
Grupo Bimbo is composed, in a first tier, of a Shareholders' Meeting, whose task is to appoint the members of the Board of Directors, which must be made up of a minimum of 5 directors and a maximum of 21; 25% of them should be independent agents. The following tier is the Steering Committee, which is established as follows:

CEO and chairman of the Board of Directors: Daniel Javier Servitje Montull

Executive Vice Presidents: Javier Augusto González Franco

       Gabino Miguel Gómez Carbajal

       Rafael Pamias Romero

Chief Financial Officer: Diego Gaxiola Cuevas

Global People Director: Juan Muldoon Barrena

Global Vice President of Information and Transformation: Raúl Ignacio Obregón Servitje

Acquisitions 
 1964: Sunbeam - Quality Bakers of America (license in Mexico)
 1995: Coronado (Mexico), Grupo Ideal (Chile)
 1998: Mrs. Baird's (United States)
 2001: Plus Vita, Pullman (Brazil)
 2002: George Weston Limited (United States)
 2004: Joyco (Mexico)
 2005: El Globo, La Corona (Mexico)
 2006: Panrico (China)
 2008: Nutrella (Brazil)
 2009: George Weston Foods Ltd. (United States)
 2010. Vero (Mexico)
 2011: Sara Lee North American Fresh Bakery (United States), Fargo (Argentina), Bimbo Iberia (Spain and Portugal)
 2014: Canada Bread (Canada), Supán (Ecuador)
 2015: Vachon, Italian Home Bakery (Canada)
 2016: Panettiere (Colombia), General Mills (Argentina), Panrico S.A.U. (Spain and Portugal)
 2017: Grupo Adghal (Morocco), East Balt Bakeries (United States), 65% of Ready India Private Limited's shares (India)
 2018: Nutra Bien (Chile), El Paisa (Colombia), Mankattan Group (China)
 2021: Modern Group (India), Kitty Bread (India)

Global sales 
Figures in millions of nominal Mexican pesos

Sustainability 
Grupo Bimbo manages its environmental actions through the platform A Sustainable Way, formed by four strategic pillars:

Carbon 
Grupo Bimbo set itself the objective of minimizing its environmental impact through the improvement and consolidation of technologies related to renewable energy, energy efficiency, and compensation of resources. To achieve this, the company joined the RE100 pact, committing itself to be 100% renewable by 2025 (energy-wise). The RE100 climate program is made up of large multinational companies to boost their processes with natural energy.

Grupo Bimbo uses air energy provided by wind farms: Piedra Larga (Mexico), Santa Rita East (USA), and three in Argentina. The first, located in the state of Oaxaca, has an installed capacity of 90 MW, which provides energy to 70% of its work centers in Mexico and avoids the annual emission of 180,000 tons of  into the atmosphere. For its part, the second is located in Texas, has a capacity of 100 MW, and supplies 100% renewable energy to its operations in the United States.

The bakery has the largest electric vehicle fleet in Mexico and one of the most robust in Latin America. It currently has 41 hybrid utility cars and more than 500 electric delivery vehicles, the latter developed by Moldex, a Grupo Bimbo's subsidiary that provides technological solutions. The company committed to growing its electric fleet in Mexico and incorporating 4,000 electric cars by 2024, 1,000 during each year.

This program stands out for having a solar roof with 308 panels, in the Grupo Bimbo corporate building in Mexico City; the largest solar roof in Mexico, and the second in Latin America in its Metropolitan Distribution Center; as well as one of the largest solar roofs in Chile.

Water 
Grupo Bimbo focuses its efforts to reduce the water footprint under the following lines of action: reduction of consumption; water treatment and reuse; and new technologies. The company fostered responsible use through dry cleaning techniques, semi-wet formats, or steam. The result of this process has saved the equivalent to 186,000,000 liters since 2016.

The company has standardized the treatment and reuse of water for green areas' irrigation, sanitary services, and vehicle washing. Grupo Bimbo reports that 82% of the water used worldwide is treated in its plants and has also incorporated rainwater in 108 work centers that, during 2019, collected more than 2.5 million rainwater liters worldwide.

Waste 
Grupo Bimbo launched, in 2019, the "Without Leaving a Trace" campaign, to minimize its impact on the environment. Through a Comprehensive Waste Management strategy, the company focuses on packaging innovation, waste reduction and reuse, and post-consumer management. The main goal of this strategy is that, by 2025, 100% of its packaging are recyclable, biodegradable, and/or compostable.

To achieve this, the company has committed to continuously improve its packaging, making use of new technologies to reduce the impact on the environment. Currently, all Grupo Bimbo's packaging in Mexico that can incorporate d2w technology (under the ASTMD 6954-18 standard) is already biodegradable. Additionally, in 2019, Grupo Bimbo developed its first 100% compostable packaging for the brand Vital, which has the OK Compost certificate, for domestic and industrial processes, issued by the TÜV institute in Austria, meaning that it biodegrades and is naturally reintegrated into the environment.

Throughout its value chain, Grupo Bimbo promotes actions to reduce and recycle waste. Its goal is to achieve, at least, 90% waste recycling in its global operations. To achieve this, today it has 43 plants with zero waste to landfills and 144 plants with more than 80% recycling, and it has implemented circular economy projects.

The company also takes part in different post-consumer programs that promote recycling in countries such as Mexico, the United States, Canada, Spain, Portugal, and Brazil.

Natural capital 
Grupo Bimbo has promoted an environmental strategy, collaborating with suppliers, focused on caring for biodiversity. The company works with strategic suppliers, small and medium enterprises (SMEs) in soy, sesame, and palm traceability programs; with the International Maize and Wheat Improvement Center (CIMMYT) in various sustainable agriculture programs.

Grupo Bimbo focuses on maintaining an environmental balance and, therefore, promotes initiatives such as Reforestamos México AC, created in 2002, whose mission is the conservation of forest ecosystems. From 2012 to 2019, this organization has managed to plant 96,609 trees in various Mexican locations and, in the last year, collaborated with 90 companies to reforest 133.95 hectares of forests in 12 different entities.

Accolades

2011 

 National Exports Award
 The Group received the Clean Transport Acknowledgment from the Ministry of Environment and Natural Resources (SEMARNAT).
 New Standard award from the Whole Grains Council, USA.
 The National Association of Private Transportation (ANTP) granted Grupo Bimbo a Safety certification in Transportation.

2012 

 National Quality Award for its Lerma plant
 The Federal Attorney for Environmental Protection (PROFEPA), recognized for the Environmental Leadership Program for Competitiveness.
 Safe Company Award to the Barcel Lerma, Mérida, and San Luis plants, granted by the Ministry of Labor and Social Security (STPS).
 National Road Safety Award - National Association of Private Transport (ANTP).
 Lorenzo Servitje Sendra, the founder of Grupo Bimbo, receives the National Entrepreneurs Award for his career.

2013 

 First place in the Companies with the Best Reputation in Mexico ranking, awarded by the Corporate Reputation Business Monitor (MERCO).
 Grupo Bimbo was recognized for its efforts in reducing the environmental footprint of its transport and distribution operations, during the 3rd edition and relaunch of the Clean Transportation program, by the Ministry of Environment and Natural Resources (SEMARNAT).
 The Technology and Maintenance Council of Mexico recognized Grupo Bimbo's Vehicle Management mechanics with six awards that were granted during the first National Mechanics Competition of Super Technical Transport.

2014 

 For the second year in a row, first place in the Companies with the Best Reputation in Mexico ranking, awarded by the Corporate Reputation Business Monitor (MERCO).
 Grupo Bimbo was recognized with the Good Neighbor Award 2013 in the United States for its actions in social responsibility and sustainability.

2015 

 The Mexican Center for Philanthropy (CEMEFI) awarded Daniel Servitje, President and CEO of Grupo Bimbo, with the recognition Commitment to Others, for the creation of Reforestamos México.
 Food Brand with the Highest Value in Mexico, by Millward Brown, in the Most Valuable Brands in Mexico ranking.
 The Ministry of the Environment and Natural Resources (SEMARNAT) granted the Excellent Environmental Performance recognition.
 For the third year in a row, first place in the Companies with the Best Reputation in Mexico ranking, awarded by the Corporate Reputation Business Monitor (MERCO).

2016 

 Grupo Bimbo ranked for the fifth time as a sustainable company in the Mexican Stock Exchange (BMV, in Spanish) index.
 Grupo Bimbo was listed in the Multilatinas 2016 ranking, which measures companies’ internationalization, as one of the region's largest companies.
 Second place in the Companies with the Best Reputation in Mexico ranking, awarded by the Corporate Reputation Business Monitor (MERCO, in Spanish).

2017 

Named as one of the World's Most Ethical Companies by the Ethisphere Institute
 For the fourth time, first place in the Companies with the Best Reputation in Mexico ranking, awarded by the Corporate Reputation Business Monitor (MERCO).
 The Bimbo Villahermosa plant received the Recognition of Environmental Excellence delivered by the Federal Procurator for Environmental Protection (PROFEPA).
 112 Grupo Bimbo associates were recognized for their good driving practices by the National Association of Private Transportation (ANTP) with the National Road Safety Award.
 CESVI recognized Grupo Bimbo as the first Mexican company to obtain the certificate of compliance with the ISO 39001:2012 standard, granted by Lloyds Register Quality Assurance Americas.

2018 

 For the second time in a row, Ethisphere Institute recognized Grupo Bimbo as one of the "World's Most Ethical Companies".
 Grupo Bimbo was included in the top ten of Expansion's "500 Most Important Companies in Mexico" ranking.
 Bimbo Bakeries USA was named Energy Star Partner of the Year by the United States Environmental Protection Agency (EPA), for its energy-saving and management strategy.
 Named one of the Greenest Mexican Companies by Forbes magazine
 For the fifth time, first place in the Companies with the Best Reputation in Mexico ranking, awarded by the Corporate Reputation Business Monitor (MERCO). This year, Grupo Bimbo held first place in the MERCO Digital ranking (for best digital reputation), and Leader with Best Reputation for Daniel Servitje.
 Guinness World Records recognized Bimbo for the Longest Hot Dog Line in the World (1,464.03 meters, equivalent to 10,000 hot dogs).
 Manufactura Magazine named Grupo Bimbo as one of the 100 Most Important Manufacturers in Mexico.
The Workplace Wellness Council (Mexico), granted Grupo Bimbo the Health Responsible Company award.
MIREC recognized Grupo Bimbo with the award for Best Corporate Energy User 2018 in Mexico for its commitment to caring for the planet.
The Federal Attorney for Environmental Protection (PROFEPA) awarded the Clean Industry Certificate (Environmental Performance Level 1) to the El Globo plant.
The PROFEPA gave Bimbo's Mexicali, Toluca and Hazpan plants the Clean Industry certificate.
The Ministry of Labor and Social Welfare (STPS) recognized the Suandy Plant in Toluca, State of Mexico with the Safe Company Award.
Safe Company recognition awarded to five of its workplaces in Nuevo León, México  thanks to the results obtained in the Self-Management Program on Health and Safety at Work (PASST), carried out by the Ministry of Labor and Social Security (STPS).
The Federal Attorney for Environmental Protection awarded the clean industry certificate to Bimbo's Mérida plant.

2019 

 Listed in Euromonitor International’s ranking of the top 100 Global Megabrands.
 For the third time in a row, Ethisphere Institute recognized Grupo Bimbo as one of the "World's Most Ethical Companies".
 Baking & Snack magazine gave Grupo Bimbo the Sustainability Award.
 The company held a position in Expansion's Most Important Companies in Mexico list.
 Havas Group listed Bimbo Mexico in its Meaningful Brands 2019 ranking.
 Expansión magazine named Grupo Bimbo as one of the ten companies in Mexico with the Best Corporate Integrity, within the ranking of the 500 Most Transparent Companies.
 The Escuela Bancaria y Comercial awarded Daniel Servitje an Honoris Causa doctorate for his career.
At the Mundo Ejecutivo Magazine's Cumbre 1000 event, Grupo Bimbo was recognized as one of the Most Global Mexican Companies.

2020 

 Bimbo obtained second place in the Most Chosen Brands in Mexico and first place as The Most Chosen in Mexico City, according to the Brand Footprint Mexico study, prepared by the consulting firm Kantar Worldpanel.
 For the fourth time in a row, Ethisphere Institute recognized Grupo Bimbo as one of the "World's Most Ethical Companies".

See also
Economy of Mexico
List of bakeries
List of companies traded on the Bolsa Mexicana de Valores
List of Mexican companies

References

External links 
 
 Company website in the United States

 
Food and drink companies of Mexico
Bakeries of Mexico
Multinational companies headquartered in Mexico
Manufacturing companies based in Mexico City
Álvaro Obregón, Mexico City
Conglomerate companies established in 1945
Food and drink companies established in 1945
Mexican companies established in 1945
Bear mascots
Companies listed on the Mexican Stock Exchange
Mexican brands